Theslof or Theslöf is a surname. Notable people with the surname include:

Jean Theslöf (1884–1966), Finnish sports shooter and singer
Nick Theslof (born 1975), American soccer manager, coach, and scout